Stiff is a 1994 Australian crime thriller novel, written by Shane Maloney. It is the first novel in a series of crime thrillers following the character of Murray Whelan, as he investigates crimes in the Melbourne area in the course of trying to keep his job with the Australian Labor Party.

Other media
In 2004, Stiff was adapted into a television movie by Huntaway Films and the Seven Network as part of The Murray Whelan Series.  The screenplay was written by John Clarke, who also directed the movie. David Wenham was cast as Murray Whelan, with a supporting cast that included Mick Molloy and Sam Neill.

References

External links
 Stiff at the Internet Movie Database
 Stiff Listing for Stiff on Shane Maloney's official website.
 Workers online review
 Melbourne Writers Festival

1994 Australian novels
Australian crime novels
Australian novels adapted into films
Novels set in Melbourne